Mustafabad is a census town in the North East district of Delhi, a union territory of India.

Demographics
, Mustafabad has a population of 89,117. Males constitute 53% of the population and females 47% in Mustafabad.  Mustafabad has an average literacy rate of 74%, higher than the national average of 59.5%.  Male literacy is 63%, and female literacy is 44%.  Twenty per cent of the population is under 6 years of age.

Mustafabad consists of Old Mustafabad, New Mustafabad.

References

Cities and towns in North East Delhi district